The 2008 FC Rubin Kazan season was the club's 6th season in the Russian Premier League, the highest tier of association football in Russia. Rubin finished the league season as champions of Russia for the first time in club history and thereby qualified for the UEFA Champions League for the first time ever, entering at the group stage of the competition during the 2009–10 season.

Season review

Squad

On loan

Left club during season

Transfers

In

 Rebrov's move was announced on the above date, but not finalised until the end of his Dynamo Kyiv contract during the summer of 2008.

Out

Loans out

Released

Competitions

Premier League

Results by round

Results

League table

Russian Cup

2008-09

The Quarterfinal game took place during the 2009 season.

Squad statistics

Appearances and goals

|-
|colspan="14"|Players away from the club on loan:

|-
|colspan="14"|Players who appeared for Rubin Kazan but left during the season:

|}

Goal scorers

Disciplinary record

References

FC Rubin Kazan seasons
Rubin Kazan
Russian football championship-winning seasons